Lamentations is the debut album of British doom metal band Solstice. Originally released in 1994 through Candlelight Records, the album was re-released in 2006 as a double-LP edition of 400 red vinyl copies and 100 copies of black vinyl with a beer bag.

Track listing
All songs written and arranged by Solstice.  Copyright Full Circle Music.
 "Lamentations IV" – 1:26
 "Neither Time nor Tide" – 5:20
 "Only the Strong" – 8:17
 "Absolution Extremis" – 6:03
 "These Forever Bleak Paths" – 6:40
 "Empty Lies the Oaken Throne" – 4:22
 "Last Wish" – 5:17
 "Wintermoon Rapture" – 7:02
 "The Man Who Lost the Sun" – 9:08
 "Ragnorok" – 3:33

Personnel

Simon Matravers – vocals
Rich Walker – guitar
Gian Pyres – guitar
Lee "Chaz" Netherwood – bass
Lennaert Roomer – drums

References

1994 debut albums
Solstice (doom metal band) albums
Candlelight Records albums